Antonio Chedraui (born 10 June 1966) is a Mexican equestrian. He competed at the 1996 Summer Olympics and the 2008 Summer Olympics.

References

1966 births
Living people
Mexican male equestrians
Olympic equestrians of Mexico
Equestrians at the 1996 Summer Olympics
Equestrians at the 2008 Summer Olympics
Equestrians at the 2015 Pan American Games
People from Xalapa
Pan American Games competitors for Mexico
Pan American Games medalists in equestrian
Pan American Games silver medalists for Mexico
Equestrians at the 2003 Pan American Games
Medalists at the 2003 Pan American Games